Peter Obresa (born 6 August 1960) is a German ice hockey player. He competed in the men's tournament at the 1988 Winter Olympics.

References

1960 births
Living people
German ice hockey players
Olympic ice hockey players of West Germany
Ice hockey players at the 1988 Winter Olympics
Sportspeople from Mannheim